The Underworld may refer to:

 Criminal underworld
 The Underworld (album), 1991 album by Evildead
 Camden Underworld, a music venue in Camden Town, London, England
 Underworld (band)
 The Underworld (film), 2018 Assamese language film

See also
Underworld (disambiguation)